JAK1 is a human tyrosine kinase protein essential for signaling for certain type I and type II cytokines.  It interacts with the common gamma chain (γc) of type I cytokine receptors, to elicit signals from the IL-2 receptor family (e.g. IL-2R, IL-7R, IL-9R and IL-15R), the IL-4 receptor family (e.g. IL-4R and IL-13R), the gp130 receptor family (e.g. IL-6R, IL-11R, LIF-R, OSM-R, cardiotrophin-1 receptor (CT-1R), ciliary neurotrophic factor receptor (CNTF-R), neurotrophin-1 receptor (NNT-1R) and Leptin-R). It is also important for transducing a signal by type I (IFN-α/β) and type II (IFN-γ) interferons, and members of the IL-10 family via type II cytokine receptors.  Jak1 plays a critical role in initiating responses to multiple major cytokine receptor families. Loss of Jak1 is lethal in neonatal mice, possibly due to difficulties suckling. Expression of JAK1 in cancer cells enables individual cells to contract, potentially allowing them to escape their tumor and metastasize to other parts of the body.

Interactions
Janus kinase 1 has been shown to interact with:

 ELP2, 
 GNB2L1 
 IL6ST, 
 Grb2, 
 IL2RB, 
 IRS1, 
 IL10RA, 
 PTPN11, 
 STAM2,
 STAT3, 
 STAT5A, 
 STAT5B,  and
 TNFRSF1A.

See also
Janus kinase inhibitor

References

Further reading

External links
 

Tyrosine kinases